Mattia Ceccaroli (born 3 February 1999) is a Sammarinese footballer who plays as a midfielder for Domagnano and the San Marino national team.

Career
Ceccaroli made his international debut for San Marino on 20 November 2022 in a friendly match against Saint Lucia, which finished as a 0–1 away loss.

Career statistics

International

References

1999 births
Living people
Sammarinese footballers
San Marino youth international footballers
San Marino under-21 international footballers
San Marino international footballers
Association football midfielders